Regina: Un Musical Para Una Nación Que Despierta (English: Regina: A musical for an awaking nation) is a special album from 2003 released after the play of the same name. Its distribution was for Mexico.

Track list

 Ciudad inhumana - Company
 Digan por qué - Jano
 Hechizo de luna - Lucero, Enrique del Olmo, Alejandro Villeli, Edgar Cañas, José Roberto Pisano
 Lama la - Danna Paola
 Luz de mi verdad - Ana Regina Cuarón
 Viva Regina - Danna Paola
 La cárcel de China - Lucero, along with the women of the crew.
 Gloria - Lucero
 No hay tiempo que perder - Lucero, Enrique del Olmo, Alejandro Villeli, Edgar Cañas, José Roberto Pisano
 Libres - Company
 Amanecer - Lucero
 Con un solo pensamiento - Lucero
 Dinos por qué - Lucero, Enrique del Olmo, Alejandro Villeli, Edgar Cañas, José Roberto Pisano
 Mira con los ojos de la esencia - Lucero, Jano, Enrique del Olmo, Alejandro Villeli, Edgar Cañas,  José Roberto Pisano

Performers

 Lucero
 Danna Paola
 Edgar Cañas
 Ana Regina Cuarón
 Jano
 Enrique del Olmo
 José Roberto Pisano
 Moisés Suárez
 Alejandro Villeli

References

2003 albums